Call Me Crazy, But... is the debut extended play (EP) by American recording artist Sevyn Streeter. It was released on December 3, 2013 through Atlantic Records in collaboration with CBE.
The writing, recording and producing of the EP began as Streeter began working on her debut album as a solo artist. The whole EP has Streeter as a writer herself and features production from Da Internz and Diplo with Chris Brown being the only feature.

Background and development 
Following the release of Chris Brown's Fortune (2012), Se7en has been featured on the album as Sevyn (removing the number "7", and adding a "v" and "y" instead). Se7en changed her stage name to Sevyn Streeter. On October 30, 2012, she released her debut single "I Like It", and premiered the music video for the song on BET's 106 & Park on January 4, 2013 in Los Angeles, California, and on May 22, 2013, she released her second single "It Won't Stop". On June 24, 2013, Streeter released an acoustic performance video for "It Won't Stop". On August 28, 2013, Streeter released the remix to "It Won't Stop" featuring Chris Brown. The music video for the remix premiered on BET's 106 & Park on October 10, 2013 and was directed by Chris Brown himself and he also appears in the video along with NBA player Dorell Wright as Sevyn's love interest. Sevyn's debut EP entitled Call Me Crazy, But..., was released on December 3, 2013. The EP debuted on Billboard's Top R&B/Hip-Hop Albums chart at No. 5 with 17,000 copies sold, according to Nielsen SoundScan.

Promotion 
Music video's for "Sex on the Ceiling" and "B.A.N.S." was released on May 20, 2014 and June 25, 2014.

Singles 
"It Won't Stop" was released as the first single on May 22, 2013. On September 10, 2013, a remix version featuring Chris Brown was released and the music video released on October 10, 2013. The song charted at number thirty on the Billboard Hot 100 and achieved gold status from Recording Industry Association of America.

A remix version of "nEXt" featuring Kid Ink was released as the second single on March 25, 2014. The music video premiered on BET's 106 & Park and Streeter's YouTube channel on March 26, 2014, directed by Derek Blanks. A second remix version of the single featuring YG was released May 19, 2014, with the music video released on May 20, 2014 also directed by Derek Blanks.

Track listing 

 Indicates a co-producer

Credits and personnel 
Credits for Call Me Crazy, But... adapted from Allmusic.

Sevyn Streeter – Primary Artist
Amber Streeter (Sevyn Streeter) – Composer, Executive Producer
Chris Brown – Executive Producer, Featured Artist
Britney Davis – Executive Producer
Tina Davis – Executive Producer
Da Internz – Producer
Free School – Producer
Picard Brothers – Producer
Diplo – Producer
Dem Jointz – Engineer, Producer
Dernst "D'mile" Emile II – Composer, Producer
Taylor Parks – Composer, Producer
Marcos Palacios – Composer, Engineer
Cameron Wallace – Composer, Producer
Jean-Baptiste – Composer
Michael McHenry – Composer  
Maxime Picard – Composer
James "J-Doe" Smith – Composer
Kevin Randolph – Composer

Yaasiel "Success" Davis – A&R
Lanre Gaba – A&R
Darrale Jones – A&R
Kawan "KP" Prather – A&R
John "J-Banga" Kercy – Engineer
Romeo Taylor – Engineer
Chris Tucker – Engineer
Beau Vallis – Mixing Engineer
Chris Gehringer – Mastering
Jaycen Joshua – Mixing
Ryan Kaul – Assistant
Kevin Randolph – Keyboards
Phillip "Logann" Scott III – Guitar, Soloist
Steve Erle – Photography
Courtney Walter – Art Direction, Design

Charts

Weekly charts

Year-end charts

References

External links 
 

Atlantic Records EPs
2013 debut EPs
Albums produced by Da Internz
Albums produced by Dem Jointz
Albums produced by Diplo
Albums produced by D'Mile
Sevyn Streeter albums